Galesh Kola-ye Bala (also Romanized as Gālesh Kolā-ye Bālā; also known as Bālā Gālesh Kolā and Gālesh-e Bālā) is a village in Bahnemir Rural District, Bahnemir District, Babolsar County, Mazandaran Province, Iran. At the 2006 census, its population was 371, in 88 families.

References 

Populated places in Babolsar County